The Assar Lindbeck Medal is a bi-annual award given to the economist(s) in Sweden under the age of 45 whose work have gained the most international recognition. The award is named in honor of Assar Lindbeck.

Recipients

See also

 List of economics awards
John Bates Clark Medal
Yrjö Jahnsson Award
Nakahara Prize
Gossen Prize

References

Economics awards